Maria Konstantinovna Pevchikh (born August 15, 1987) is a Russian investigative journalist, activist and head of the investigative unit of the Anti-Corruption Foundation (FBK). Pevchikh is known for exposing high-level criminal activity in Russia.

Biography 
Maria Pevchikh was born on August 15, 1987 in the city of Zelenograd, Russian Soviet Federative Socialist Republic. Pevchikh graduated from Zelenograd gymnasium No. 1528. In 2010, Pevchikh led a Russian delegation to participate in the G8 Youth Summit in Vancouver, Canada. In 2010 she moved to the United Kingdom, where she graduated from the faculty of political science of the London School of Economics.

Pevchikh holds Russian-British dual citizenship.

Maria Pevchikh gained media attention in 2020 after the poisoning of Russian opposition leader Alexei Navalny. She was one of the companions of Alexei Navalny during his trip across Russia when he was poisoned. When it became known that Navalny had fallen into a coma, Pevchikh went to the hotel where he had stayed and took plastic water bottles from there. The bottles were taken from Russia to Germany on the plane on which Navalny was evacuated. Experts later found traces of the Novichok chemical warfare agent.

Investigations 
Maria Pevchikh began reading the blog of Alexei Navalny in 2010 and later worked on almost all investigations that appeared on the blog after 2011. The first investigation she worked on was an investigation into the Russian VTB Bank and its drilling equipment. The investigation was launched by the Anti-Corruption Foundation (FBK) and Pevchikh worked to complete it.

Her job as head of the investigation department is to gather information and prepare textual material for investigations.

On December 2, 2019, the FBK investigation department released a video about the connections between Russian banker Andrey Kostin and Russian journalist . Maria Pevchikh, during an interview with the Global Investigative Journalism Network, told what methods were used during the investigation.

Pevchikh and Russian activist Georgy Alburov received the Redkollegia journalism award for their investigation into the Putin's Palace, a palace complex allegedly built for Russian President Vladimir Putin.

References 

Living people
1987 births
Russian anti-corruption activists
Anti-Corruption Foundation
Russian investigative journalists
Russian women journalists
Moscow State University alumni
Alumni of the London School of Economics
Redkollegia award winners
Russian activists against the 2022 Russian invasion of Ukraine
People from Zelenograd